Anand Prakash Paranjpe is an Industrialist and an elected member of the 15th Lok Sabha elections from Kalyan in Maharashtra, then representing the Shiv Sena Party. He joined Nationalist Congress Party before 2014 general elections.

Background
Anand Prakash Paranjpe was born on 16 May 1970 to Mother Supriya Paranjpe and Father Paranjape Prakash Vishvanath, who was also a member of the Shiv Sena party and served as a member of the Lok Sabha from 1996 until his death in 2008 due to cancer.

Education
Anand Paranjpe has a B.E in Mechanical  and has done his MBA in Marketing, both from Pune University. He is fluent in Marathi, English and Hindi languages.

Career
Anand Paranjpe won the Lok Sabha seat from Kalyan, Maharashtra, India in the 2009 Lok Sabha elections defeating Nationalist Congress Party candidate Vasant Davkhare.  He was the only Shiv Sena Member of Parliament to be elected from the Mumbai Thane region in the 15th Lok Sabha and since his election has been appointed as the Secretary of the Shiv Sena party. He was also member of 14th Lok Sabha by winning by-elections in May 2008 from Thane (Lok Sabha constituency)
He lost 2014 general election from Kalyan constituency on Nationalist Congress Party's ticket against Shiv Sena's Shrikant Shinde with the margin of 250,749 votes. He got 190,143 votes and Shrikant Shinde got 440,892 votes.

Personal life
Anand Paranjpe married Sonal Paranjpe in January 1999 and they both live in Naupada, Thane.

Footnotes and citations

References
Profile on Parliament of India

People from Maharashtra
1973 births
Living people
India MPs 2004–2009
India MPs 2009–2014
People from Thane
Marathi politicians
Shiv Sena politicians
Lok Sabha members from Maharashtra
People from Kalyan-Dombivli
United Progressive Alliance candidates in the 2014 Indian general election
Politicians from Thane
Nationalist Congress Party politicians from Maharashtra